Bolt Head is a National Trust headland on the South Coast of Devon, England, United Kingdom, situated west of the Kingsbridge Estuary. It is a popular viewpoint on the South West Coast Path between Hope Cove, Bolt Tail, Bolberry Down and Salcombe.

See also
 RAF Bolt Head
 Bolt Tail

References

External links
 Bolt Head Airfield

Headlands of Devon